Skenea polita is a species of sea snail, a marine gastropod mollusk in the family Skeneidae.

Description
The size of the shell attains 1.6 mm.

Distribution
This species occurs in the Atlantic Ocean off Iceland and the Rockall Trough.

References

 Warén A., 1993: New and little known mollusca from Iceland and Scandinavia. Part 2; Sarsia 78: 159–201
 Gofas, S.; Le Renard, J.; Bouchet, P. (2001). Mollusca, in: Costello, M.J. et al. (Ed.) (2001). European register of marine species: a check-list of the marine species in Europe and a bibliography of guides to their identification. Collection Patrimoines Naturels, 50: pp. 180–213

External links
 

polita
Gastropods described in 1993